Lycopus americanus, common names American water horehound or American bugleweed, is a member of the genus Lycopus.

It blooms in late summer and is found in much of North America.

Medicinal plant
It is reputed to have medicinal properties and has been used as a dye.

References

 Niering,W., Olmstead, N., National Audubon Society Guide to North American Wildflowers, Eastern Region,1995, plate 184 and page 573,

External links

Jepson Manual Treatment
 USDA plants database
Photo gallery

americanus
Flora of North America
Medicinal plants
Plants described in 1815
Taxa named by Gotthilf Heinrich Ernst Muhlenberg